David Kriel (born ) is a South African rugby union player for the  in the United Rugby Championship and for the  in the Currie Cup. His regular position is fullback but he can be utilised as a utility back.

Kriel was named in the  squad for the 2020 Super Rugby season. Kriel joined the  ahead of the Super Rugby Unlocked competition, joining his brother Richard at the Bulls. Kriel made his debut for the Bulls in Round 1 of Super Rugby Unlocked against . and played and won Superugby and Currie Cup twice.

Honours
 Currie Cup winner 2020–21, 2021
 Pro14 Rainbow Cup runner-up 2021
 United Rugby Championship runner-up 2021-22

References

South African rugby union players
Living people
1999 births
Rugby union wings
Rugby union fullbacks
Bulls (rugby union) players
Stormers players
Blue Bulls players
Rugby union players from Potchefstroom